The Alien Years is a three-part miniseries that first aired on the Australian Broadcasting Corporation on 19 April 1988. It was directed by Donald Crombie and written by Peter Yeldham. It stars Victoria Longley, John Hargreaves, Christoph Waltz. Yeldham later adapted his screenplay into a novel of the same name.

Plot
Elizabeth Paterson (Victoria Longley) is the daughter of an important figure in the Australian government. She falls for and ultimately marries Stefan (Christoph Waltz), a German national. They move to South Australia to run a vineyard but their peace is disturbed by the outbreak of the First World War. The government orders that all German nationals living in Australia must be imprisoned.

Cast
 Victoria Longley as Elizabeth Parson
 Christoph Waltz as Stefan Mueller
 John Hargreaves as William
Jane Harders as Edith
Kim Krejus as Martha
Tom Jennings as Harry
 Nick Tate as North

Production
The series took three months to produce and was partly shot in Hahndorf in the Adelaide Hills and Bethany in the Barossa Valley.

References

External links
 
The Alien Years at Austit

World War I television drama series
Television shows set in South Australia
Films directed by Donald Crombie
1980s Australian television miniseries
Australian Broadcasting Corporation original programming
English-language television shows
1988 films